The Plattensandstein is a Middle Triassic (Anisian) geologic formation in southern Germany and northern Switzerland. Fossil theropod tracks have been reported from the formation.

Plattensandstein is used in Germany as a natural building stone. It derives its name from the fact that it is usually fissile into slabs with a thickness of several centimeters.

Fossil content 
The formation has provided fossils of:
 Basileosaurus freyi
 Sclerosaurus armatus

See also 
 List of dinosaur-bearing rock formations
 List of stratigraphic units with theropod tracks
 Flagstone, another scissile sandstone, which is used as a roofing material

References

Bibliography 
 
  

Geologic formations of Germany
Geologic formations of Switzerland
Triassic System of Europe
Triassic Germany
Triassic Switzerland
Anisian Stage
Sandstone formations
Fluvial deposits
Lacustrine deposits
Ichnofossiliferous formations
Paleontology in Germany
Paleontology in Switzerland
Building stone